Vrpsko is a village in Municipality of Prilep.

Villages in Prilep Municipality